The 10%ers is a British television comedy series, broadcast on ITV.

Set in the office of a theatrical agent, it began as a pilot in 1993 shown as part of ITV's short-lived Comedy Playhouse (not to be confused with the BBC's long-running Comedy Playhouse), then ran for two series, shown in 1994 and 1996. The regular cast were: Clive Francis, who played the main character Dominic Eden,  Benedict Taylor as Atin,  Colin Stinton as Tony,  and Elizabeth Bennett as Joan.  There were cameo appearances from Jonathan Ross and Nicholas Parsons.
 
The pilot was written by Rob Grant and Doug Naylor, though the first and second series were written by Naylor and various co-writers, including Steve Punt and Paul Alexander.  The producer was Ed Bye, then Marcus Mortimer.

Transmissions
 Pilot: Comedy Playhouse - 23 February 1993
 Series 1: Monday 18 April – 6 June 1994 - 7 episodes
 Series 2: Tuesday 9 July – 3 September 1996 - 7 episodes.

References

External links

ITV sitcoms
1993 British television series debuts
1996 British television series endings
1990s British sitcoms
Carlton Television
Television series by ITV Studios
English-language television shows
1990s British workplace comedy television series